3 Vulgar Videos from Hell is a DVD by American heavy metal band Pantera, released in 1999 and re-released in 2006. It combines all three of the band's previous home videos (Cowboys from Hell: The Videos, Vulgar Video, and 3 Watch It Go) and features music videos, live performances, appearances, interviews, and footage of the band on tour and in the studio from mid-1989 to early 1997.

In 2018, there have been several teasers on the band's official Instagram page for the release of home video number 4. There has been no indication so far as to the date of release.

Track listing

Disc 1 
Covers the Cowboys from Hell and Vulgar Display of Power eras (roughly 1990–1993). There are brief clips, in the beginning of the film, of a 1989 show during the band's Power Metal tour. The original version contains only one disc.

Cowboys from Hell: The Videos
"Cowboys from Hell"
"Psycho Holiday"
"Cemetery Gates"
"Mouth for War"
"Heresy" (live at the 1990 Foundations Forum Convention in Los Angeles)
"The Art of Shredding" (live at the 1990 Foundations Forum Convention in Los Angeles)

Disc 2 
3: Watch It Go

Covers primarily the Far Beyond Driven era and also partially The Great Southern Trendkill (roughly 1994–1997).
 "I'm Broken"
 "5 Minutes Alone"
 "Drag the Waters"
 "Planet Caravan"
 (Crazy Train 'Dimebag Darell Guitar medley solo')
 (HellRaiser MedlEY-Cowboys From Hell/Fucking Hostile/Shattered/Domination)

Monsters in Moscow 

Part of the band's set at the 1991 "Monsters in Moscow" festival.
 "Cowboys from Hell"
 "Primal Concrete Sledge"
 "Psycho Holiday"

Celebrity cameos
Several famous bands and musicians appear in the video. Among those who can be seen performing with Pantera are:

 Rob Halford (of Judas Priest)
 Kerry King (of Slayer)
 Exodus
 Tommy Victor (of Prong)
 Skid Row
 White Zombie
 Sacred Reich
 Suicidal Tendencies
 Alice in Chains
 Scott Ian (of Anthrax)
 Jason Newsted (of Metallica)
 Crowbar
 Marilyn Manson
 KISS
 Sepultura
 Black Sabbath

Other celebrities who make guest appearances in the video include:
 Jerry Cantrell, Mike Starr and Layne Staley of Alice in Chains
 Mike Muir of Suicidal Tendencies
 Barry Stern of Trouble
 Kirk Windstein of Crowbar
 Ace Frehley and Gene Simmons of KISS
 Tommy Lee of Mötley Crüe
 Sara Lee Lucas, Pogo, Twiggy Ramirez, and Marilyn Manson of Marilyn Manson
 Trent Reznor of Nine Inch Nails
 Billy Corgan of The Smashing Pumpkins
 Yngwie Malmsteen of Alcatrazz
 Robert Trujillo of Suicidal Tendencies and Metallica
 Nick Menza of Megadeth
 Jeff Hanneman of Slayer
 Tony Iommi of Black Sabbath

Certifications

References

Pantera albums
1999 video albums
1999 compilation albums
1999 live albums
Live video albums
Music video compilation albums
East West Records video albums